A trochanter is a tubercle of the femur near its joint with the hip bone. In humans and most mammals, the trochanters serve as important muscle attachment sites. Humans are known to have three trochanters, though the anatomic "normal" includes only the greater and lesser trochanters. (The third trochanter is not present in all specimens.)

Etymology
"Trokhos" (Greek) = "wheel", with reference to the spherical femoral head which was first named "trokhanter". Later usage came to include the femoral neck.

Structure
In human anatomy, the trochanter is a part of the femur. It can refer to:

 Greater trochanter
 Lesser trochanter
 Third trochanter, which is occasionally present

Other animals
 Fourth trochanter, of archosaur leg bones
 Trochanter (arthropod leg), a segment of the arthropod leg

See also 
 Intertrochanteric crest
 Intertrochanteric line

References

External links 
 
 

Trochanter